The Guest Director position is held by a different individual each year who is invited by the Telluride Film Festival Directors to join them in the creation of the festival program. The guest director serves as a key collaborator in all of the festival's programming decisions, bringing new ideas and, quite often, overlooked films to Telluride. Below is a list of each guest director followed by the films the director specifically chose to highlight.

Guest Directors
 1988 - Donald Richie chose: Japan's Cutting Edge, a 2-hour collection of Japanese film dating from 1981-1988 and Remembering Sessue Hayakawa, a two film montage of this film great's first roles in the 1914 film Wrath of the Gods and the 1919 film The Dragon Painter
 1989 - Errol Morris chose: Henry: Portrait of a Serial Killer (USA, 1986, 90min) and Make Way for Tomorrow (USA, 1956, 84min)
 1990 - Bertrand Tavernier chose:    (France, 1935, 105min) and Pursued (USA, 1947, 101min)
 1991 - Laurie Anderson chose: Danzon (Mexico, 1991, 102min) and New Video Art, the first video projection program at the festival which included a series of modern video shorts. 
 1992 - G. Cabrera Infante chose: Laughter (USA, 1929, 99min), Victims of Sin (Mexico, 1950, 85 min) and La Virgen de la Caridad (Cuba, 1930, 90min)
 1993 - John Boorman chose: Fear and Desire (USA, 1953, 61min), Upstage (USA, 1926, 70min)
 1994 - John Simon The Easy Life (Aka Il Sorpasso) (Italy, 1962, 105min),One Fine Day (Italy, 1969, 105min) and They Shoot Horses, Don't They? (US, 1969, 125min)
 1995 - Phillip Lopate
 1996 - B. Ruby Rich
 1997 - Peter Von Bagh
 1998 - Peter Bogdanovich
 1999 - Peter Sellars
 2000 - Edgardo Cozarinsky
 2001 - Salman Rushdie chose: Metropolis (Germany, 1927, 92min), Alphaville (France, 1965, 100min), and Solaris (USSR, 1972, 167min)
 2002 - Alberto Barbera chose: Bitter Rice (Italy, 1949, 100min), Bandits of Orgosolo (Italy, 1961, 98min) and Il Posto (Italy, 1961, 90min)
 2003 - Stephen Sondheim chose: La Belle Equipe (France, 1936, 100min), Carnet du Bal (France, 1952, 144min) and Panique (France, 1946, 96min)
 2004 - Buck Henry
 2005 - Don DeLillo chose: The Passenger (Italy, 1975, 126min), Wanda (USA, 1970, 102min.), The Spirit of the Beehive (Spain, 1973, 97min.)
 2006 - J. P. Gorin chose: Maldone (France, 1928, 83min), Remorques (France, 1941, 81min), Lumière d'Ètè (France, 1943, 112min)
 2007 - Edith Kramer chose: The Way You Wanted Me (Finland, 1944, 102min), Millions Like Us (U.K., 1943, 101min), Marie, a Hungarian Legend (Hungary, 1932, 68min)
 2008 - Slavoj Zizek
 2009 - Alexander Payne
 2010 - Michael Ondaatje
 2011 - Caetano Veloso
 2012 - Geoff Dyer chose: Baraka (US, 1992, 96min), Beau Travail (France, 1999, 92min), The Great Ecstasy of Woodcarver Steiner (Germany, 1974, 45min), Lessons of Darkness (France, UK, Germany, 1992, 50min), Stalker (Russia, 1979, 160min), Together (Sweden, 2000, 106 min), Unrelated (UK, 2007, 100min)
 2013 - 40th year of Festival. Don Delillo - La Morte Rouge (Spain, 2006, 34min) + The Zapruder Film (1963), Buck Henry - The Terminal Man (US, 1972, 107min ), Phillip Lopate - Naked Childhood (France, 1969, 83min), Michael Ondaatje - La Jetee (France, 1962, 28min ) + Elephant (UK, 1989, 39 ), B Ruby Rich - One Way or Another (Cuba, 1974, 78min), Salman Rushdie - Mahanagar (India, 1963, 135min)
 2014 - Kim Morgan and Guy Maddin chose: California Split (US, 1974, 108min), Il Grido (Italy, 1957, 116min), M [Losey] (US, 1951, 88min), Man's Castle (US, 1933, 75min) The Road to Glory (US, 1936, 103min), Wicked Woman (US, 1953, 77min)
 2015 - Rachel Kushner chose: The Mother and the Whore (France, 1973, 210min), Mes Petites Amoureuses (France, 1974, 123min), Wake in Fright (Australia, 1971, 114min), Cocksucker Blues (U.S., 1979, 93min), A Day in the Country (France, 1936, 40min), Uncle Yanco (U.S., 1967, 22min), Une Bonne à Tout Faire (U.S./Switzerland, 1981/2005, 8min), The Mattei Affair (Italy, 1972, 116min)
 2016 - Volker Schlöndorff chose: I Was Nineteen (East Germany, 1968, 119min, It was the Month of May (U.S.S.R., 1970, 109min), The Fire Within (France, 1963, 108min), The Barefoot Contessa (U.S., 1954, 128min), Les Enfants Terribles (France, 1950, 106min), Spies (Germany, 1928, 143min)
 2017 - Joshua Oppenheimer
 2018 - Jonathan Lethem
 2019 - Pico Iyer
 2021 - Barry Jenkins
 2022 - Kantemir Balagov and Kira Kovalenko

References

American film awards
Film festivals in Colorado
Telluride, Colorado
Guest directors